Maria Isabel Bueso Barrera (born 1994/1995) is a Guatemalan-born activist with Maroteaux-Lamy syndrome living in the United States under deferred action.

Background 
Bueso was born in Guatemala. She was diagnosed with Maroteaux-Lamy syndrome, or MPS VI, when she was one and a half. In 2003, when she was seven years old, she and her family moved to the Bay Area so that Bueso could participate in a clinical research trial for a treatment for Morquio A syndrome at UCSF Benioff Children's Hospital. That treatment successfully obtained FDA approval, and Bueso continued to participate in follow-up studies.

In 2018, she graduated from California State University East Bay, where she had majored in sociology and had been involved in disability advocacy.

Threat to deferred action status 
Because of deferred action, Bueso and her family were allowed to stay in the United States so that she could continue getting lifesaving treatment at UCSF Benioff Children's Hospital. When the Trump administration rescinded that program in August 2019, Bueso and her family were told they had 33 days to leave the country and return to Guatemala, even though the treatment Bueso requires is not available there. UCSF Benioff staff held a rally in support of Bueso, and Congressman Mark DeSaulnier introduced a private bill that would give Bueso and her family immigrant visas. Bueso testified about her situation at a House Committee on Oversight and Reform hearing. After public outcry, U.S. Citizenship and Immigration Services reversed the decision and said they would continue to review deferred action requests on a case-by-case basis.

In December 2019, immigration officials granted Bueso deferred action for two more years. In December 2022, her status was adjusted to allow her to become a permanent resident.

References

External links

Living people
California State University, East Bay alumni
Guatemalan women activists
Guatemalan emigrants to the United States
Year of birth missing (living people)
Disability rights activists